R.C Prakash (born 1979) is a retired Indian football player. He is retired player and played for  HAL SC in the I-League in India as a forward. He was the Captain of HAL SC in 2011–12 I-League.

External links

goal.com

1979 births
Living people
Indian footballers
I-League players
Footballers from Bangalore
Hindustan Aeronautics Limited S.C. players
Association football forwards